Penicillium freii is a psychrophilic species of the genus of Penicillium which produces xanthomegnin and patulin. Penicillium freii occurs in meat, meat products, barley and wheat

See also
 List of Penicillium species

References

Further reading

 
 

freii
Fungi described in 1994